Lei Chen-Tzu, also known as Lei Jen Zu, is the name of a supernatural Chinese hero. Lei Chen-Tzu, though not born a dragon, took on the form of a dragon when his adoptive father Wen Wang – the god of literature – was taken prisoner, in order to save him.

References

Zhou dynasty